The Government Champhai College is a government university college associated with Mizoram University, located in Champhai, Mizoram, in India. Established as a private college in 1971 by the philanthropists of Champhai town and neighboring villages, the founders' objective was providing collegiate education to the students of this remote hilly tribal town near the international border of India with Myanmar.

History
Champhai College was initially affiliated to Gauhati University, then to North Eastern Hill University in 1973. From 2 July 2001, upon the creation of the Mizoram University that came up in Aizawl, the affiliation was directly transferred to the new university. In 1978 the college attained the status of deficit grants-in-aid College under Mizoram Government. The college started degree courses in science in 1997. The pre-university course that was introduced in 1995 has now been delinked and the institute has only under-graduate programmes. The college received UGC recognition under 2f and 12B in 1987.

Departments
Govt. Champhai College has the following departments:
 Arts Stream
 Department of English
 Department of Mizo
 Department of Economics
 Department of Education
 Department of Geography
 Department of History
 Department of Political Science
 Commerce Stream
 Department of Commerce
 Computer Science
 Department of Computer Science - BCA
 Science Stream
 Department of Physics
 Department of Chemistry
 Department of Mathematics
 Department of Botany
 Department of Zoology

Champhai college also has facility to learn spoken Hindi, English and Burmese under RUSA scheme.

Accreditation

NAAC (National Accreditation and Assessment Council), a body under an umbrella of UGC, has sent peer team on March 23, 2004, to inspect the college under a 9-point scale grading system, in which the college secured 70-75 marks to attain a grade “B”. The accreditation is valid for 5 years, extendable to 2 years.

Campus layout
The Chief Minister of Mizoram Pu Lalthanhawla recently inaugurated a Multipurpose Hall, Arts & Commerce building, Science & BCA building, Administrative & Library building, Boys Hostel, Guest House and Staff Quarters costing 9 crore rupees.

See also
Education in India
Education in Mizoram
Mizoram University
Literacy in India

References

External links 
Champhai College

Universities and colleges in Mizoram
Colleges affiliated to Mizoram University
Champhai